Nigel Colin McCrery (born 30 October 1953 in London) is an English screenwriter and ex-police officer. He is the creator of the long-running crime dramas Silent Witness (1996-present) and New Tricks (2003-15).

Early life
Because of his father's (Colin George McCrery 1928–1990) RAF service, Nigel spent much of his early childhood travelling around the world before finally settling in Toton, Nottinghamshire. He attended Bispham Drive Junior School, followed by George Spencer Secondary School in Stapleford. The school later named a building after him, the Nigel McCrery Learning and Inclusion Centre which was opened on Thursday 14 March 2013. Later he attended Beeston College of Further Education in Beeston, Nottinghamshire. He married in 1976 at the age of 23 and moved to West Bridgford. He and his then wife Gill had three children. Nigel and Gill are now divorced.

He joined the Nottinghamshire Constabulary in 1978, aged 25 serving in West Bridgford, Clifton, The Meadows, Carlton and St Ann's. During his service he also worked on a number of murder cases and became interested in forensic science. McCrery retired from the police in August 1987 before attending Trinity College, Cambridge from October of the same year to read Modern History. In 1988 he persuaded Sebastian Coe and Steve Cram to race around the Great Court at Trinity College, a race made famous in the film Chariots of Fire; Coe won by a whisker. The event raised of £50,000 for Great Ormond Street Hospital. He also organised the first ever debate between Cambridge University and Harvard University, once again raising a considerable amount of money for children's charities.

Career
He was selected for the BBC's Graduate Entry Scheme in 1990. After working on a variety of BBC documentaries, he joined the BBC drama department in 1992 becoming the researcher on the award-winning Our Friends in the North.  He then went on to create the series Backup (1995/1997), Silent Witness, All The King's Men (1999), Born and Bred (2002/2006), Impact (2003) and New Tricks (2003/2015).

He has also written several crime novels, Silent Witness (five books), The Detective Inspector Lapslie Books (five books with two more to come). He wrote Under the Guns of the Red Baron, History of the VC, History of the SAS, All the King's Men (The Vanished Battalion). A "Silent Witness" short story also appeared in the "Mail On Sunday" over three parts.

He has also written, "Silent Witness, a History of Forensic Science" (Random House August 2013) "Into Touch' international Rugby players killed 1914-18. January 1915. "The Final Season" footballers killed in the Great War, Random House.  "The Final Wicket" First Class Cricketers killed in action during World War One. Pen and Sword. "The Fallen Few" Aircrew killed in action during the Battle of Britain, Pen and Sword.  "Hear the Boat Sing" Men who took Part in the Oxford and Cambridge Boat Race who died in World War One was published (History Press) in February 2017. "The Extinguished Flame" Olympians Killed in World War One was published (Pen and Sword) in July 2016. His latest book, "The Coming Storm" Test and First Class Cricketers killed in World War Two (Pen and Sword) was published in July 2017. His Lapslie book "Flesh and Blood" was also published in 2017. McCrery is currently working on another Lapslie book "Blood Line" to be published in 2018.

McCrery's first play 'Going Home’, based on the fate of 20,000 Jews murdered after the end of the Holocaust, will be produced in Nottingham commencing on 27 January 2019 (Holocaust Day) before moving to London.

He gives much of his time to children suffering from dyslexia, a condition he has suffered with from birth. On Thursday 14 February 2013, his old School The George Spencer Academy, in Stapleford, Nottingham invited McCrery back to open their new Learning and Inclusion centre and named the building after him, 'The Nigel McCrery Learning and Inclusion Centre." McCrery is now involved with the charity "Care after Combat" which visits and helps former military personnel in prison.
 
In 1992 while working as an Assistant Producer on the BBC1 show Tomorrow's World, McCrery arranged and paid for the remains of the Russian Royal Family to be flown to the UK for DNA examination. The work was carried out by Peter Gill who with the assistance of the Russian Forensic Scientist Paval Ivanoff established that the remains were indeed those of Tsar Nicholas II and the rest of his family. The remains were transported in an old BA travel bag before being placed in the back of his Volvo and taken to Peter Gill's house. "Not many people," McCrery later joked, "can say they had the Russian Royal family in the boot of their car".

He worked for The Prince Edward (a friend from his Cambridge days) from 2001 to 2002 as Head of Drama at Ardent Productions. He is a member of the Groucho Club and Blacks. McCrery is single and lives in Nottingham.

References

1953 births
Living people
English screenwriters
English male screenwriters